Buds is a 1991 compilation album released by Australian alternative rock group, The Stems, on Citadel Records.

Track listing

 "Make You Mine" (Dom Mariani)– 4:45
 "She's A Monster" (Mariani)– 3:47
 "Tears Me In Two" (Richard Lane/Julian Matthews)– 3:22
 "Can't Resist" (Mariani)– 2:36
 "Love Will Grow" (Mariani)– 3:16
 "Just Ain't Enough" (Mariani)– 2:45
 "Jumping To Conclusions" (Mariani)– 4:12
 "Under Your Mushroom" (Lane/Matthews)– 2:36
 "At First Sight" (Mariani)– 4:05
 "Rosebud" (Lane/Matthews)– 3:39
 "Mr Misery" (Mariani)– 3:37
 "Sad Girl" (Mariani)– 3:35
 "For Always" (Mariani)– 3:08
 "On And On" (Mariani)– 4:13
 "All You Want Me For" (Matthews)– 2:17
 "No Heart" (Mariani)– 3:16
 "Don't Let Me" (Lane/Mariani)– 2:21
 "She's Fine" (Mariani)– 2:33

References

External links

 Citadel Records

The Stems albums
1991 compilation albums